Brian E. Mueller is an American academic and university administrator. He is the current president of Grand Canyon University and CEO of Grand Canyon Education. Mueller has been the President of the university since July 1, 2008, and a director since March 2009. Mueller is also notably the CEO of the for-profit publicly traded Grand Canyon Education Inc that provides services to GCU.

Prior to taking the reins of Grand Canyon University, Mueller was the president and a director of Apollo Education Group, the parent company of the University of Phoenix.  Mueller also held executive positions with the University of Phoenix Online including CEO, chief operating officer, and senior vice president. While in a leadership position, enrollment at the University of Phoenix grew from 3,500 to 340,000.

Mueller graduated from Concordia University with a bachelor's degree in secondary education and a master's degree in education.

Personal
Mueller grew up in a middle-class family in Wisconsin with seven siblings.

Mueller married his wife, Paula, who is often by his side at university events such as concerts and basketball games.  The couple has four sons; the two older attended Arizona State University and the youngest attended Grand Canyon.

Mueller enjoys golf and has been golfing with his children since they were three.

Grand Canyon University
The university was established in 1949 but was on the brink of closing its doors in 2004 due to millions of dollars of debt.  Mueller was hired in 2008 when the university went to the public market for an infusion of capital investment to put towards the West Phoenix campus.  Under Mueller's watch, the university's ground campus enrollment has jumped from about 1,000 to over 20,000 as of the fall of 2018.  Enrollment in online programs is over 70,000.  Mueller's goal for the ground campus is to increase enrollment to 25,000 and continue to expand the campus.

Mueller finished fourth in the Phoenix Business Journal's 2014 Businessman of the Year voting behind Michael Bidwill (Arizona Cardinals), MaryAnn Guerra (BioAccel), and Bob Parsons (GoDaddy).

Early career
Mueller's first job in higher education was at his alma mater, Concordia University. He was a professor at the university from 1983 to 1987 as well as the university's head men's basketball coach.

Mueller started out as a high school teacher before heading to Arizona State University to enroll in a Ph.D. program. He planned to finish that program and then resume teaching again due to his love for the students, however those plans changed after having several children. When his fourth child was on the way, he chose to join the University of Phoenix as an enrollment counselor in hopes to better support his family financially.

Mueller had heard they were hiring, but knew nothing more of the university. He did not plan on staying long, but after six months he believed they had something big going for them and he no longer wanted to leave. While skeptical at first about the use of internet for delivering education, he was part of the internal meetings that resulted in the University of Phoenix offering its first online courses in 1989. Three years later, he would be put in charge of marketing and enrollment.

References

Grand Canyon University faculty
Concordia University Nebraska alumni
Year of birth missing (living people)
Educators from Wisconsin
Place of birth missing (living people)
Living people
Concordia University Nebraska faculty